Penta may refer to:

Places
 , an Italian hamlet of Fisciano, Salerno
 Penta-di-Casinca, a French municipality of Corsica
 Penta, Chhattisgarh, a town in Dantewada district of Chhattisgarh, India
 , a small river in Lithuania

Other
 Penta, a video game character in Antarctic Adventure
 Penta Penguin, a video game character in the Crash Bandicoot series
 Pena Transportes Aéreos, a defunct Brazilian airline
 Penta engine, a piston engine design
 Pentagón Jr., a luchador also called Penta El Zero Miedo
 Penta Water, a brand of bottled water
 Volvo Penta, a subsidiary of Volvo
 Penta Investments, a Slovak private equity and investment group
 The herbaceous vine Gynostemma pentaphyllum, or jiaogulan
 penta-, Greek numeral prefix meaning "five"
 Pentachlorophenol, a pesticide
 Penta, a section of the newspaper Barron's

See also